Nicholas Pettas  (born January 23, 1973, in Mykonos) is a Greek-Danish karateka, former heavyweight kickboxer and actor, who fought out of Team Spirit AE in Tokyo, Japan. Pettas mainly competed in the promotion K-1 between 1998 and 2007, and was the winner of the K-1 Japan Grand Prix 2001.

Although an undersized heavyweight, Pettas is known for his powerful low kicks and holds notable victories over Yusuke Fujimoto, Nobu Hayashi, Musashi, Gökhan Saki and Péter Varga.

Early life and karate career
Pettas was born in Mykonos, Greece. Following the death of his father, he moved to Denmark with his mother.

After being beaten up in a street fight when he was fourteen, he decided to join a karate school to learn to defend himself. Not knowing which styles there were, he was introduced to Kyokushin by Michael Mattheson, a friend of his brother Tony. He found himself a new following and needed no more schooling, and so at the age of eighteen decided to leave high school in order to save up money to go to Japan and study with Masutatsu Oyama, the founder of Kyokushin. After getting permission to join the uchi-deshi program, a live-in training of 1000 days, he moved to Japan from Denmark at the age of eighteen. At the age of twenty-one, he completed the vigorous training course to become the second non-Japanese ever to finalize the program (the first being Judd Reid). He was last uchi-deshi of Master Oyama, who died soon after Pettas' graduation.

After his graduation of the programme, he competed in several tournaments and achieved many significant titles and honours such as reaching the title in European Karate Championships and placing 5th and 3rd place in the World Championships, respectively in 1995 and 1997.

Kickboxing career

Early career (1998–2002)
Following his successful career in full contact karate, Pettas joined K-1, a Japan-based kickboxing organization. He made his debut against Stefan Leko at K-1 Dream '98 on July 18, 1998, in Nagoya, Japan. Leko was able to dominate Pettas with his superior boxing skills, and knocked him out in the second round.

After a decision loss to Ryuta Noji in March 1999, Pettas returned to K-1 to compete in the eight-man tournament at the K-1 World Grand Prix 2000 in Nagoya on July 30, 2000. He stopped fellow karateka Ricky Nickolson with a low kick in the quarter-finals before going on to face Jérôme Le Banner in the semis. The end of the fight was somewhat bizarre. Le Banner knocked Pettas down twice, forcing the referee to stop the match. Upon the second knockdown, Pettas returned to his feet sharply and prepared to punch Le Banner only to stop. Le Banner then replied by striking Pettas with a right hook, knocking him unconscious.

Following this, he lost a unanimous decision to Michael McDonald in a superfight at the K-1 World Grand Prix 2000 in Fukuoka on October 9, 2000. He bounced back, however, by using low kicks to KO Peter Varga at K-1 Gladiators 2001 on March 17, 2001.

The peak of Pettas' career came on August 19, 2001, when he won the K-1 Andy Memorial 2001 Japan GP Final at the Tokyo Dome. He finished Yusuke Fujimoto and Nobu Hayashi with his now-famous low kicks in the quarters and semis, respectively, before advancing to the final to take on Musashi. After three rounds the bout was called a draw and went into an extra round to decide the winner, after which Pettas prevailed with a unanimous decision victory.

This tournament win qualified him for the 2001 K-1 World Grand Prix, the annual gathering of the best heavyweight kickboxers in the world for a one-night tournament. At the K-1 World Grand Prix 2001 Final in Tokyo on December 8, 2001, he was eliminated at the first stage by Alexey Ignashov. Ignashov, the much larger fighter, dominate Pettas before knocking him out with a knee strike in round two.

He returned to the ring on April 21, 2002, against Peter Aerts at K-1 Burning 2002 in Hiroshima, and was knocked out with a knee once again. Then, on June 2, 2002, he fought Sergei Gur at K-1 Survival 2002 in Toyama. During the second round, Pettas hit Gur with a right low kick. Gur checked the kick, breaking Pettas' shin bone. This injury kept Pettas out of competition for 3 years and 4 months.

Return from injury and later career (2005–2008)
He finally returned to the ring on October 8, 2005, against a young Gökhan Saki at Bushido Europe: Rotterdam Rumble in Rotterdam, Netherlands. He defeated Saki via technical knockout when his corner stopped the fight in the second round. Saki could not provide an answer to the striking arsenal of Pettas. Pettas showed superior technical fighting intelligence than Saki who did not do any damage 

In late 2006, Pettas knocked out two opponents and earned a return to K-1. Badr Hari greeted him in his second debut at the annual New Year's Eve martial arts event, K-1 PREMIUM 2006 Dynamite!!, on December 31, 2006. Hari won the fight as Pettas was unable to continue after obtaining a broken arm in the second round.

He then rematched Peter Aerts in a superfight at the K-1 World Grand Prix 2007 in Hong Kong on August 5, 2007. Aerts got the better once again, knocking Pettas out with a spectacular high kick in round two.

After losing his past five fights in K-1, Pettas finally broke this streak with a sensational KO victory over South Korean giant Kim Young-hyun (often anglicised to Younghyun Kim) at K-1 PREMIUM 2007 Dynamite!! on December 31, 2007. Pettas wore down Kim, who stood fifteen inches taller than him, with low kicks before dispatching him with punches forty-one seconds into round two. This KO is to this day an all time record for a small man to stop a big man in stand up striking combat sport. The size difference was 15.3 inches / 39 cm (1.78m/5′10″  vs. 2.17m/7′1.½″ ). Kim's fellow Korean Choi Hong-man was only 12.9 inches / 33 cm taller than Mighty Mo when he lost via KO in March 2007. In boxing the record stands at 14.9 inches / 38 cm when Randy Davis (1.80m/5′11″) knocked out Tom Payne (2.18m/7′2″) in 1985.

His last fight came on August 9, 2008, when he was eliminated in the quarter-finals of the K-1 World Grand Prix 2008 in Hawaii by Rick Cheek, severing a muscle in his thigh made him pull out and Rick Cheek was awarded the winner by TKO due to referee stoppage.

Personal life
Pettas currently lives in Tokyo, Japan. He is also an actor, appearing in Japanese cinema and television. Perhaps his best known role is alongside Kimura Takuya in the TV drama Change. From 2008 to 2009, the NHK World show Samurai Spirit was created and produced to fit his personality and the show has won several international prizes for best sports educational shows and best sports documentary.
He is currently co-presenter of the NHK World television show Imagine-nation, with Chiaki Horan. He is currently a Reebok Ambassador and Trainer. With his current success he plans on opening a second Reebok CrossFit in Roppongi.

Titles

Karate
 8th European Weight Championships Heavyweight Champion (1995)
 6th World Open Karate Tournament 5th Place (1995) (lost to Francisco Filho)
 1st World Weight Category Championships 3rd Place (1997) (lost to Glaube Feitosa)
 7th World Open Karate Tournament 5th Place (1999) (lost to Aleksandr Pitchkounov)
 10th Shin Karate World Championships Champion (2000)

Kickboxing
K-1
 2001 K-1 Japan Grand Prix Champion

Filmography
 House of Smack Down (2003)
 Road 88 (2003)
 Sibirian Express 5 (2004)
 Oh! My Zombie Mermaid (2004)
 Wrestling Inferno (2005)
 The Winds of God, Kamikaze (2005)
 LoveDeath (2006)
 Puzzle (2008)
 Change (2008)
 Fumō Chitai (2009)

Kickboxing record

|-
|
|Loss
| Rick Cheek
|K-1 World Grand Prix 2008 in Hawaii
|Honolulu, Hawaii, USA
|TKO (referee stoppage)
|align="center"|1
|align="center"|1:15
|9-9
|2008 Hawaii Grand Prix quarter-final.
|-
|
|Win
| Kim Young-hyun
|K-1 PREMIUM 2007 Dynamite!!
|Osaka, Japan
|KO (right punch)
|align="center"|2
|align="center"|0:41
|9-8
| 
|-
|
|Loss
| Peter Aerts
|K-1 World Grand Prix 2007 in Hong Kong
|Hong Kong
|KO (right high kick)
|align="center"|2
|align="center"|2:24
|8-8
| 
|-
|
|Loss
| Badr Hari
|K-1 PREMIUM 2006 Dynamite!!
|Osaka, Japan
|TKO (arm injury)
|align="center"|2
|align="center"|1:28
|8-7
| 
|-
|
|Win
| Takeshi Onda
|HEAT 2
|Aichi, Japan
|TKO (corner stoppage)
|align="center"|2
|align="center"|1:00
|8-6
| 
|-
|
|Win
|
|Xplosion Superfight 14
|Sydney, Australia
|KO (punches)
|align="center"|3
|align="center"|-
|7-6
| 
|-
|
|Win
| Gökhan Saki
|Bushido Europe: Rotterdam Rumble
|Rotterdam, Netherlands
|TKO (corner stoppage)
|align="center"|2
|align="center"|-
|6-6
| 
|-
|
|Loss
| Sergei Gur
|K-1 Survival 2002
|Toyama, Japan
|TKO (leg injury)
|align="center"|2
|align="center"|1:00
|5-6
| 
|-
|
|Loss
| Peter Aerts
|K-1 Burning 2002
|Hiroshima, Japan
|KO (knee)
|align="center"|1
|align="center"|2:50
|5-5
| 
|-
|
|Loss
| Alexey Ignashov
|K-1 World Grand Prix 2001 Final
|Tokyo, Japan
|KO (right knee)
|align="center"|2
|align="center"|1:21
|5-4
|2001 K-1 World Grand Prix quarter-final.
|-
|
|Win
| Musashi
|K-1 Andy Memorial 2001 Japan GP Final
|Saitama, Japan
|Extra round decision (unanimous)
|align="center"|4
|align="center"|3:00
|5-3
|2001 Japan Grand Prix final.
|-
|
|Win
| Nobu Hayashi
|K-1 Andy Memorial 2001 Japan GP Final
|Saitama, Japan
|KO (right low kick)
|align="center"|1
|align="center"|1:26
|4-3
|2001 Japan Grand Prix semi-final.
|-
|
|Win
| Yusuke Fujimoto
|K-1 Andy Memorial 2001 Japan GP Final
|Saitama, Japan
|KO (right low kick)
|align="center"|1
|align="center"|2:57
|3-3
|2001 Japan Grand Prix quarter-final.
|-
|
|Win
| Péter Varga
|K-1 Gladiators 2001
|Yokohama, Japan
|KO (right low kick)
|align="center"|3
|align="center"|1:39
|2-3
| 
|-
|
|Loss
| Michael McDonald
|K-1 World Grand Prix 2000 in Fukuoka
|Nagoya, Japan
|Decision (unanimous)
|align="center"|3
|align="center"|3:00
|1-3
| 
|-
|
|Loss
| Jérôme Le Banner
|K-1 World Grand Prix 2000 in Nagoya
|Nagoya, Japan
|KO (left hook)
|align="center"|1
|align="center"|3:00
|1-2
|2000 Nagoya Grand Prix semi-final.
|-
|
|Win
| Ricky Nickolson
|K-1 World Grand Prix 2000 in Nagoya
|Nagoya, Japan
|KO (right low kick)
|align="center"|1
|align="center"|1:27
|1-1
|2000 Nagoya Grand Prix quarter-final.
|-
|-
|
|Loss
| Stefan Leko
|K-1 Dream '98
|Nagoya, Japan
|KO (punch)
|align="center"|2
|align="center"|1:09
|0-1
| 
|-
|-
| colspan=10 | Legend:

See also
List of male kickboxers
List of K-1 Events

References

External links
 EXELLING management office
Profile at K-1
 

1973 births
Living people
Danish male kickboxers
Greek male kickboxers
Heavyweight kickboxers
Danish male karateka
Greek male karateka
Danish male actors
Greek male actors
21st-century Greek male actors
People from Mykonos
Danish people of Greek descent
Greek people of Danish descent
Danish expatriates in Japan
Greek expatriates in Japan
Kyokushin kaikan practitioners
Japanese television presenters